Vexillum perrieri is a species of marine sea snail in the family Costellariidae.

References

Mitridae
Gastropods described in 1929